Microceris is a Neotropical genus of firetips in the family Hesperiidae endemic to Brazil. The genus is monotypic containing the single species Microceris variicolor.

References

Natural History Museum Lepidoptera genus database

Hesperiidae genera
Hesperiidae of South America
Monotypic butterfly genera